Xavier Academy is a secondary education school managed by the Nepal Education Foundation, located in Lazimpat, Kathmandu.

References

External links
 

Schools in Nepal
1997 establishments in Nepal